The Lithuanian Association for Writers is an association for writers and poets in Lithuania, founded in 1922. It gives annual prizes and awards to talented Lithuanian writers.

The Association also has its own publishing house.

References

External links
 Lithuanian Writers' Union

Lithuanian writers' organizations